Weldu Negash Gebretsadik (born 12 November 1986) is a Norwegian athlete competing in long-distance events. Representing Norway at the 2019 World Athletics Championships, he competed in men's marathon. He finished in 24th place.

In 2018, he competed in the men's marathon at the 2018 European Athletics Championships held in Berlin, Germany. He did not finish his race.

References

External links

Norwegian male marathon runners
1986 births
Living people
World Athletics Championships athletes for Norway
Eritrean emigrants to Norway